Friedrich Wilhelm August Ludwig Kiepert (6 October 1846 – 5 September 1934) was a German mathematician who introduced the Kiepert hyperbola.

Selected works
 De curvis quarum arcus integralibus ellipticis primi generis exprimuntur, 1870, dissertation
 Tabelle der wichtigsten Formeln aus der Differential-Rechnung, many editions
 Grundriss der Differential- und Integral-Rechnung, Helwing, Hannover, 2 vols., many editions
 Grundriss der Integral-Rechnung, 2 vols., many editions
 Grundriss der Differential-Rechnung, many editions

See also
Lemoine's problem

References

Friedrich Wilhelm August Ludwig Kiepert

External links

 
 Werke von Ludwig Kiepert im Katalog der UB Hannover
 Friedrich Wilhelm August Ludwig Kiepert, mathematician
 Kiepertsche Kurve

19th-century German mathematicians
20th-century German mathematicians
Humboldt University of Berlin alumni
Academic staff of the University of Hanover
Heads of universities in Germany
1934 deaths
1846 births
Academic staff of Technische Universität Darmstadt